Quartz Mountain is a located  east of Roseburg in Douglas County, Oregon, United States. It has a large deposit of high-purity silica.

The summit was the site of a Forest Service lookout tower until it was removed in 1970.

References

External links
 
 

Mountains of Douglas County, Oregon
Mountains of Oregon
Umpqua National Forest